Novak Grebostrek (1312–14) was a veliki vojvoda of Serbian King Stefan Milutin (r. 1282–1321), who commanded a Serbian contingent supporting Byzantine Emperor Andronikos II Palaiologos against Turks in Asia Minor. He led a second Serbian contingent sent by Milutin to aid the Byzantines, the first having participated in the Battle of Gallipoli (1312). Novak's army had the task of liberating the Byzantine counties around Prussa, Nicaea and Nicomedia from the Turks. The victories of Novak have been recorded in papers of Church of St. George, Staro Nagoričane. In two chrysobulls of Andronikos II Palaiologos to the Serbian Chilandar monastery, dating to October 1313 and July 1317, Andronikos showed gratitude to Stefan Milutin for his aid, as detailed in the prefaces.

It has been claimed that Novak was the father of Vojihna. Svetomir Nikolajević (1844–1922) concluded this on the basis after Alexander Hilferding (1831–1872), who recorded folk traditions traveling Serbia before 1859.

Novak and veliki župan Dragoš are the only nobility mentioned in Danilo II's Život kraljeva i arhiepiskopa srpskih. Novak is the oldest known veliki vojvoda, after him, Jovan Oliver had the title.  He is enumerated in Serbian epic poetry, and poems (or dramas) of Dragoljub J. Filipović (1884–1933), Dragutin Subotić (1887–1952), Rastko Tadić and Milutin Bojić (1892–1917).

References

Sources

14th-century Serbian nobility
14th-century Byzantine people
Medieval Serbian military leaders
Byzantine generals
People of the Kingdom of Serbia (medieval)
Characters in Serbian epic poetry